Nikolay Kravchenko (born 27 July 1956) is a Soviet windsurfer. He competed in the men's Division II event at the 1988 Summer Olympics.

References

1956 births
Living people
Soviet male sailors (sport)
Soviet windsurfers
Olympic sailors of the Soviet Union
Sailors at the 1988 Summer Olympics – Division II
Place of birth missing (living people)